Corinnaeturris is a genus of sea snails, marine gastropod mollusks in the family Clathurellidae.

Species
Species within the genus Corinnaeturris include:
 Corinnaeturris angularis Figueira & Absalão, 2010
 Corinnaeturris leucomata (Dall, 1881)
 Species brought into synonymy 
 Corinnaeturris rhysa (Watson, 1881): synonym of Kurtziella rhysa (Watson, 1881)

References

 Gofas, S.; Le Renard, J.; Bouchet, P. (2001). Mollusca, in: Costello, M.J. et al. (Ed.) (2001). European register of marine species: a check-list of the marine species in Europe and a bibliography of guides to their identification. Collection Patrimoines Naturels, 50: pp. 180–213
 Figueira, Raquel Medeiros Andrade & Absalao, Ricardo Silva, 2010. Deep-water Mangeliinae, Taraninae and Clathurellinae (Mollusca: Gastropoda: Conoidea: Turridae) from the Campos Basin, southeast Brazil. Scientia Marina 74(4): 731-743

External links

 
Clathurellidae
Gastropod genera